Michael Davies (born 17 July 1976) was an English cricketer. He was a right-handed batsman and a left-arm slow bowler.

Having spent three years prior to the beginning of his first-class career in Second XI cricket, playing for Leicestershire, Northamptonshire and Essex. Moving to First Class cricket, he played for Northamptonshire and the full Essex team in a four-year-long career. He then played for Essex CB in the Minor Counties Trophy of 2001 and played in the Essex Second XI before retiring.

External links
Michael Davies at CricketArchive 

1976 births
English cricketers
Living people
Leicestershire cricketers
Northamptonshire cricketers
Essex cricketers
NBC Denis Compton Award recipients
British Universities cricketers
Essex Cricket Board cricketers